Centratherum is a genus of flowering plants in the daisy family. Common names: Brazilian Button, Lark Daisy, กระดุมไพลิน, กระดุมหยก, กระดุมม่วง, Kèšavardhini, കേശവർദ്ധിനി, മുടിനീളി.

 Species
 Centratherum australianum (K.Kirkman) A.R.Bean - New South Wales, Queensland
 Centratherum cardenasii H.Rob. - Bolivia
 Centratherum confertum K.Kirkman - Paraguay, Rio Grande do Sul, Corrientes
 Centratherum phyllolaenum (DC.) Benth. ex Hook.f - Indian Subcontinent
 Centratherum punctatum Cass. - South America (Venezuela to northern Argentina), Panama, Nicaragua, Trinidad

Considered invasive in Hawaii (USA), Galapagos Islands, New Caledonia, Puerto Rico, Virgin Islands

References

Vernonieae
Asteraceae genera